A choanosome is an inner region of a sponge, supported on the choanoskeleton, the structure that contains the choanocytes.

See also 
 Choanoderm

Sponge anatomy

References